Sikandar Hayat Khan Bosan (born 5 November 1957) is a Pakistani politician who served as Minister for National Food Security and Research, in Abbasi cabinet from August 2017 to May 2018. He previously served as the Minister for National Food Security and Research in the Third Sharif ministry. Bosan previously held the cabinet portfolio of Minister for Food, Agriculture & Livestock from 2004 to 2007 during the Shaukat Aziz ministry.

Bosan had been a member of the National Assembly of Pakistan between 1997 and May 2018. He served as Minister of State for Food, Agriculture and Livestock from 2002 to 2004 during the Zafarullah Khan Jamali ministry.

Early life and education
He was born on 5 November 1957 in Multan, Pakistan.

He has done B.A.

Political career
Bosan started his political career in 1983 as member of District Council Multan. He was elected as the member of the Provincial Assembly of Punjab in 1985 Pakistani general election for the first time, in 1988 Pakistani general election for the second time, and in 1990 Pakistani general election for the third time.

Bosan become member of National Assembly of Pakistan for the first time in 1997 Pakistani general election. In 2002 Pakistani general election, he was re-elected as member of the National Assembly for the second time from constituency NA-151 on the ticket of Pakistan Muslim League (Q). In 2002, he was made Minister of state without portfolio and reportedly assigned to Ministry of Food, Agriculture and Livestock In 2004, he was formally appointed as Minister of State for Food, Agriculture and Livestock and later in 2004 was appointed as Minister for Food, Agriculture & Livestock.

In 2008 Pakistani general election, Bosan lost the National Assembly seat to Yousaf Raza Gilani.

Bosan left Pakistan Muslim League (Q) to join the Pakistan Tehreek-e-Insaf. Later in 2013, he left Pakistan Tehreek-e-Insaf and joined Pakistan Muslim League (N).

In 2013 Pakistani general election, he was re-elected as member of the National Assembly for the third time. He was made Minister for National Food Security & Research in June 2013.

He had ceased to hold ministerial office in July 2017 when the federal cabinet was disbanded following the resignation of Prime Minister Nawaz Sharif after Panama Papers case decision. Following the election of Shahid Khaqan Abbasi as Prime Minister of Pakistan in August 2017, he was inducted into the federal cabinet of Abbasi. He was appointed as the Federal Minister for National Food Security and Research. Upon the dissolution of the National Assembly on the expiration of its term on 31 May 2018, Bosan ceased to hold the office as Federal Minister for National Food Security and Research.

In 2018 he again joined PTI and was allocated a party ticket to contest election from NA-154 Multan, but ticket was taken back from him and he was expelled from the party on Imran Khan's orders after a harshful reactions within the PTI and from his constituents as he was a federal minister in PMLN regime till last day. He contested the elections as an independent candidate from NA-154 Multan but was unsuccessful and lost the seat to a candidate of PTI by a wide margin of 38,000 votes.

References

|-

|-

1957 births
Living people
Pakistani MNAs 1997–1999
Pakistani MNAs 2002–2007
Pakistani MNAs 2013–2018
Punjab MPAs 1985–1988
Punjab MPAs 1988–1990
Punjab MPAs 1990–1993
Government ministers of Pakistan
Politicians from Multan
Pakistan Muslim League (N) MNAs
Pakistan Muslim League (Q) MNAs